Paraphytoseius is a genus of mites in the Phytoseiidae family.

Species
 Paraphytoseius bhadrakaliensis (Gupta, 1969)
 Paraphytoseius chihpenensis Ho & Lo, 1989
 Paraphytoseius cracentis (Corpuz & Rimando, 1966)
 Paraphytoseius hilli Beard & Walter, 1996
 Paraphytoseius horrifer (Pritchard & Baker, 1962)
 Paraphytoseius hualienensis Ho & Lo, 1989
 Paraphytoseius hyalinus (Tseng, 1973)
 Paraphytoseius nicobarensis (Gupta, 1977)
 Paraphytoseius orientalis (Narayanan, Kaur & Ghai, 1960)
 Paraphytoseius parabilis (Chaudhri, 1967)
 Paraphytoseius santurcensis De Leon, 1965
 Paraphytoseius scleroticus (Gupta & Ray, 1981)
 Paraphytoseius seychellensis Schicha & Corpuz-Raros, 1985
 Paraphytoseius subtropicus (Tseng, 1972)
 Paraphytoseius urumanus (Ehara, 1967)

References

Phytoseiidae